"Samo ponekad" is a song by the Yugoslav new wave band Šarlo Akrobata, from the album Bistriji ili tuplji čovek biva kad..., released in 1981.

Cover versions 
 Električni Orgazam frontman Srđan Gojković "Gile" covered the song on the Jako dobar tattoo Milan Mladenović tribute album in 2002.
 Serbian actor and musician Nikola Pejaković "Kolja" covered the song and released it as a digital download single for his second studio album Kolja, released in 2009.

References

Bibliography
 EX YU ROCK enciklopedija 1960-2006, Janjatović Petar; 

1981 songs
Jugoton singles